Kampville is an unincorporated community in St. Charles County, in the U.S. state of Missouri.

The community has the name of the local Kamp family.

References

Unincorporated communities in St. Charles County, Missouri
Unincorporated communities in Missouri